Mustafa al-Siba'i was a Syrian politician and activist. He was dean of the Faculty of Islamic Jurisprudence and the School of Law at the University of Damascus. From 1945 to 1961 he was the leader of the Muslim Brotherhood in Syria, the Syrian branch of the Muslim Brotherhood.

Life
Mustafa al-Siba'i studied Islamic theology at al-Azhar University, Cairo. While in Egypt he went to lectures by Hassan al-Banna, founder of the Egyptian Brotherhood, and joined the Brotherhood in 1930. Returning to Syria, Siba'i taught at Damascus University, and in 1940 was made Dean of the Faculty of Theology. In 1941 he established Shabab Mohammad (Mohammad Youth), a religious paramilitary group based on the Egyptian Muslim Brotherhood. Shabab Mohammad allied itself with the National Bloc in resisting the French mandate.

In 1946, al-Siba'i founded a Syrian branch of the Muslim Brotherhood, leading it through several parliamentary campaigns. After the United Arab Republic was formed in 1958, Gamal Nasser outlawed the Muslim Brotherhood and arrested hundreds of members. Joining the underground, Siba'i supported the 1961 coup ending the UAR. However, the Ba'ath government which came to power in 1963 again outlawed the Muslim Brotherhood, and banned many of Siba'i's works.

al-Siba'i's The Socialism of Islam (1959) argued that Islam was compatible with socialism. It was reprinted in Egypt and endorsed by several members of the Egyptian government, though al-Siba'i complained at the use of his book to justify Nasserism.

Sickness and death
al-Siba'i suffered from Hemiparesis for 8 years before death on 3 October 1964.

Works
 Al-Din wa al-Dawla fi al-Islam (Religion and State in Islam), 1954
 Ishtirakiyyat al-Islam (The Socialism of Islam), 1960. 
 Hakaza Alamatni al-Hayat (This is how life taught me), 1972.
 Some glittering aspects of the Islamic civilization, 1983. Translated by Sharif Ahmad Khan.
 The life of Prophet Muhammad: highlights and lessons, 2004. Translated by Nasiruddin al-Khattab.

References

1915 births
1964 deaths
Syrian activists
Syrian Salafis
Syrian politicians
Academic staff of Damascus University
Al-Azhar University alumni
Muslim Brotherhood of Syria politicians
People from Homs
Muslim socialists
Syrian anti-communists